Information Services & Use is a peer-reviewed scientific journal covering the area of information technology, especially information management and applications. It is peer-reviewed. Its current editors-in-chief are Arnoud De Kemp and Elliot R. Siegel. The journal was established in 1981 and is  published by IOS Press.

Abstracting and indexing 
Information Services & Use is abstracted and indexed in:

External links 
 

Publications established in 1981
Computer science journals
Quarterly journals
Knowledge management journals
IOS Press academic journals
English-language journals